Francis Isidore Power (1852–1912) was a solicitor and politician in Queensland, Australia. He was a Member of the Queensland Legislative Council.

Early life
Francis Isidore Power was born on 28 February 1852 at South Brisbane, the son of Michael Power and his wife Anna Maria (née Connolly). About 12 years old, he was sent to Ireland to attend the Clongowes Wood College in County Kildare and then Trinity College in Dublin. He worked in a firm of solicitors for 5 years before returning to Queensland in 1873. He established himself as a solicitor in Gympie.

Politics
Power was involved in local government, serving on the Glastonbury Divisional Board and the Widgee Divisional Board. He developed a flood prevention scheme for the Gympie goldfields, which led to his appointment as the first chairman of the Gympie Drainage Board.

Power was appointed to the Queensland Legislative Council on 15 July 1901. From 19 November 1907 to 18 February 1908, he was Minister for Justice and Attorney-General and Representative of the Government in Legislative Council. He served on the Council until his death on 24 June 1912.

Later life
Power died on 24 June 1912 at Gympie. He was buried in the Gympie Cemetery on 26 June 1912.

See also
 Members of the Queensland Legislative Council, 1900–1909; 1910–1916

References

Members of the Queensland Legislative Council
Attorneys-General of Queensland
People from Gympie
1852 births
1912 deaths